In mathematics, and in particular, algebra, a generalized inverse (or, g-inverse) of an element x is an element y that has some properties of an inverse element but not necessarily all of them. The purpose of constructing a generalized inverse of a matrix is to obtain a matrix that can serve as an inverse in some sense for a wider class of matrices than invertible matrices. Generalized inverses can be defined in any mathematical structure that involves associative multiplication, that is, in a semigroup.  This article describes generalized inverses of a matrix .

A matrix  is a generalized inverse of a matrix  if  A generalized inverse exists for an arbitrary matrix, and when a matrix has a regular inverse, this inverse is its unique generalized inverse.

Motivation  
Consider the linear system

If  is nonsingular (which implies ) then  will be the solution of the system. Note that, if  is nonsingular, then

Now suppose  is rectangular, or square and singular. Then we need a right candidate  of order  such that for all 

That is,  is a solution of the linear system . 
Equivalently, we need a matrix  of order  such that

Types 
Important types of generalized inverse include:
 One-sided inverse (right inverse or left inverse)
 Bott–Duffin inverse
 Drazin inverse
 Moore–Penrose inverse

Some generalized inverses are defined and classified based on the Penrose conditions: 

 
 
 
 

where  denotes conjugate transpose.

When  is non-singular, any generalized inverse  and is therefore unique. For a singular , some generalised inverses, such as the Drazin inverse and the Moore–Penrose inverse, are unique, while others are not necessarily uniquely defined.

Examples

Reflexive generalized inverse 
Let

 

Since ,  is singular and has no regular inverse. However,  and  satisfy Penrose conditions (1) and (2), but not (3) or (4).

One-sided inverse 
Let

 

Since  is not square,  has no regular inverse. The matrix  has no left inverse.

Inverse of other semigroups (or rings) 

The element b is a generalized inverse of an element a if and only if , in any semigroup (or ring, since the multiplication function in any ring is a semigroup).

The generalized inverses of the element 3 in the ring  are 3, 7, and 11, since in the ring :

The generalized inverses of the element 4 in the ring  are 1, 4, 7, and 10, since in the ring :

If an element a in a semigroup (or ring) has an inverse, the inverse must be the only generalized inverse of this element, like the elements 1, 5, 7, and 11 in the ring .

In the ring , any element is a generalized inverse of 0, however, 2 has no generalized inverse, since there is no b in  such that .

Construction 

The following characterizations are easy to verify:
 Let  be of rank . Then,is a generalized inverse of  if and only if .

Uses 
Any generalized inverse can be used to determine whether a system of linear equations has any solutions, and if so to give all of them. If any solutions exist for the n × m linear system

,

with vector  of unknowns and vector  of constants, all solutions are given by 

,

Solutions exist if and only if  is a solution, that is, if and only if . If A has full column rank, the bracketed expression in this equation is the zero matrix and so the solution is unique.

Generalized inverses of matrices 
The generalized inverses of matrices can be characterized as follows. Let , and 

 

be its singular-value decomposition.

In particular, the pseudoinverse is given by :

Transformation consistency properties 
In practical applications it is necessary to identify the class of matrix transformations that must be preserved by a generalized inverse. For example, the Moore–Penrose inverse,  satisfies the following definition of consistency with respect to transformations involving unitary matrices U and V:

.

The Drazin inverse,  satisfies the following definition of consistency with respect to similarity transformations involving a nonsingular matrix S:

.

The unit-consistent (UC) inverse,  satisfies the following definition of consistency with respect to transformations involving nonsingular diagonal matrices D and E:

.

The fact that the Moore–Penrose inverse provides consistency with respect to rotations (which are orthonormal transformations) explains its widespread use in physics and other applications in which Euclidean distances must be preserved. The UC inverse, by contrast, is applicable when system behavior is expected to be invariant with respect to the choice of units on different state variables, e.g., miles versus kilometers.

See also 
 Block matrix pseudoinverse
 Regular semigroup

Citations

Sources

Textbook

Publication 

 
 
 

Matrices
Mathematical terminology